Ivanča is a village in the municipality of Novi Pazar, Serbia.

Populated places in Raška District